Kalle Jalkanen (10 May 1907 in Suonenjoki – 5 September 1941 in Kirjasalo) was a Finnish cross-country skier who competed in the late 1930s. He won a gold medal at the 1936 Winter Olympics in Garmisch-Partenkirchen in the 4 × 10 km relay.  He won the relay along with Sulo Nurmela, Klaes Karppinen and Matti Lähde.

Jalkanen's biggest successes were at the Nordic skiing World Championships where he earned four medals, including one gold (50 km: 1938), two silvers (18 km and 4 × 10 km relay: both 1937), and one bronze (18 km: 1938)

He was killed during World War II.

Cross-country skiing results
All results are sourced from the International Ski Federation (FIS).

Olympic Games
 1 medal – (1 gold)

World Championships
 4 medals – (1 gold, 2 silver, 1 bronze)

References

External links 

1907 births
1941 deaths
People from Suonenjoki
Finnish male cross-country skiers
Cross-country skiers at the 1936 Winter Olympics
Olympic medalists in cross-country skiing
FIS Nordic World Ski Championships medalists in cross-country skiing
Olympic gold medalists for Finland
Medalists at the 1936 Winter Olympics
Finnish military personnel killed in World War II
Sportspeople from North Savo
20th-century Finnish people